Van Tassel or Van Tassell is a surname. Notable people with the surname include:

George Van Tassel (1910–1978)
Gilbert Van Tassel Hamilton (1877–1943)
William Gilbert van Tassel Sutphen (1861–1945)
Park Van Tassel (1853–1930)
Marie Van Tassell (1871–1946)

Legendary characters with the surname include:
Baltus Van Tassel, character in "The Legend of Sleepy Hollow"
Katrina Van Tassel, romantic character in "The Legend of Sleepy Hollow"

See also
Van Tassell (disambiguation)

Dutch-language surnames
Surnames of Dutch origin